Michael R. Harris (born June 9, 1967 in Georgetown, Ontario) is a Canadian curler. Harris led his team to win the silver medal at the 1998 Winter Olympics.

Curling career 
Relatively unknown due to the shadows cast out of Ontario in the form of superstars Russ Howard, Ed Werenich and Wayne Middaugh, and having not qualified to a Brier out of Ontario yet, Harris rose to stardom when he skipped his team of Richard Hart, Collin Mitchell and George Karrys to a win at the Canadian Olympic trials in 1997, qualifying the team for the 1998 Winter Olympics.  They would defeat the favoured Kevin Martin 6-5 in the trials final, after a 7-2 round robin record had the team sole 1st and a direct bye to the final.

At the Olympics, Harris' team dominated throughout, while other pre-Olympic favourites such as reigning World Champions Sweden (skipped by Peja Lindholm) and reigning World silver medallist and European Champions Germany (skipped by Andy Kapp) struggled and were never in playoff contention. Harris lost only one game in the round-robin (a meaningless final game to three-time World Champion and 1988 Olympic Gold medallist Eigil Ramsfjell, skipping Norway).  They would win their semi final over the U.S team skipped by Tim Somerville 7-1, in a game conceded after 8 ends, before losing in a major upset in the gold medal final against the surprise finalists, Team Switzerland skipped by Patrick Hürlimann, who they had easily beaten 8-3 in the round robin.  Harris was ill during the final game, which many attribute to why they had lost.   He shot at only 25% in the final, and even had to take several short breaks on the sideline throughout due to lack of physical energy. However, he was not the only one to struggle in the gold medal game, third Richard Hart shot only 58% and second Collin Mitchell an uncharacteristic 73% (though lead George Karrys was stellar at 98%).

Prior to the Olympics, Harris' only claim to fame on the national curling scene had been a 6-5 record at the 1986 Canadian Junior Men's Curling Championship and a 4-7 record at the 1989 Canadian Mixed Curling Championship. After the 1998 Olympics, Harris skipped a team to the 2004 Nokia Brier where they finished 6-5.

Harris continued to curl competitively into the 2010s. He became curling commentator for the CBC and Rogers Sportsnet and worked as a golf professional.  

Harris currently coaches the Tanner Horgan rink.

Personal life
Harris currently lives in Toronto. He is married and has three children. He is employed as the executive director of the Northern Ontario Curling Association, in addition to his commentary work on Rogers Sportsnet.

References

External links
 

Curlers from Toronto
Olympic curlers of Canada
Olympic silver medalists for Canada
People from Halton Hills
Curlers at the 1998 Winter Olympics
1967 births
Living people
Curling broadcasters
Olympic medalists in curling
Medalists at the 1998 Winter Olympics
Canadian male curlers
Canada Cup (curling) participants
Canadian curling coaches